Trump National Golf Club, Philadelphia is a private golf club located in Pine Hill, New Jersey featuring a  course designed by Tom Fazio. Formerly named Pine Hill Golf Club, it was purchased and renamed by the Trump Organization on Christmas Eve, 2009. The club sits about a mile and half from Pine Valley Golf Club and Freeway Golf Course.

The clubhouse of Trump National Golf Club is set atop a prominent hill  in the middle of Camden County.  The  clubhouse provides panoramic views of the surrounding landscape and Philadelphia city skyline.  This hill is  lower than Arneys Mount in Burlington County, and 10 feet lower than the highest point in Camden County, which is near Berlin.  The golf course was built upon the site of the former Ski Mountain at Pine Hill in 1998.

See also
 Donald Trump and golf
 List of things named after Donald Trump

References

External links

Buildings and structures in Camden County, New Jersey
Golf clubs and courses in New Jersey
Golf clubs and courses designed by Tom Fazio
Assets owned by the Trump Organization
Pine Hill, New Jersey
2009 establishments in New Jersey